Chrysommata is a genus of beetles in the family Cerambycidae, containing the following species:

 Chrysommata keithi (Tavakilian & Penaherrera-Leiva, 2003)
 Chrysommata lauracea (Penaherrera-Leiva & Tavakilian, 2003)

References

Rhinotragini
Cerambycidae genera